Micrurus bernadi is a species of venomous snake in the family Elapidae. The species is endemic to eastern Mexico. There are currently no recognized subspecies.

Etymology
The specific name, bernadi, is in honor of French physician Santiago Bernad, who collected the type specimen.

Geographic range
Within Mexico, M. bernadi is found from eastern Hidalgo southward to northern Puebla and parts of northwestern Veracruz.

Habitat
The preferred natural habitat of M. bernadi is forest.

Reproduction
M. bernadi is oviparous.

References

Further reading
Cope ED (1887). "Catalogue of Batrachians and Reptiles of Central America and Mexico". Bulletin of the United States National Museum 32, 1-98. (Elaps bernadi, new species, p. 87).
Roze JA (1996). Coral Snakes of the Americas: Biology, Identification, and Venoms. Malabar, Florida: Krieger Publishing. 340 pp. .
Schmidt KP (1933). "Preliminary Account of the Coral Snakes of Central America and Mexico". Field Museum of Natural History Zoological Series 20 (6): 29–40. (Micrurus bernadi, p. 40).
Woolrich-Piña GA, Smith GR, Lemos-Espinal JA, Méndez de la Cruz FR (2019). "Micrurus bernadi (Saddled Coralsnake) Thermal Ecology". Herpetological Review 50 (1): 163.

bernadi
Reptiles described in 1887
Endemic reptiles of Mexico
Fauna of the Sierra Madre Oriental